Jaggan may refer to:

Jaggan, Pakistan, a village in Sindh, Pakistan
Jaggan, Queensland, a locality in the Tablelands Region, Queeensland, Australia